Marcus Delon Wesson (born August 22, 1946) is an American mass murderer and child rapist, convicted of nine counts of first-degree murder and 14 sex crimes, including the rape and molestation of his underage daughters. His victims were his children, fathered through incestuous sexual abuse of his daughters and nieces, as well as his wife's children. He has been described as the worst mass murderer of Fresno, California.

Early life and education

Marcus Wesson was born in Kansas, the eldest of four children of Benjamin and Carrie Wesson. He was raised as a member of the Seventh-day Adventist Church. Wesson claimed that his mother was a religious fanatic. His father was an alcoholic and child abuser who abandoned the family when Wesson was a child. By the early 1960s, the family had moved to San Bernardino, California.

After dropping out of high school, Wesson joined the U.S. Army, serving from 1966 to 1968 as an ambulance driver.

Abuse 
Shortly after leaving the military, Wesson moved in with an older woman, Rosemary Solorio and her eight children in San Jose, California. In 1971, Solorio gave birth to Wesson's son. In 1974, Wesson began sexually abusing Solorio's eight-year-old daughter, Elizabeth. Wesson married Elizabeth Solorio when she turned 14, and he was 34. Four months later, she gave birth to her first child. Eventually the couple had 10 children together, including one infant who died.

One of Elizabeth's younger sisters left her own seven children with them, claiming to be unable to care for them due to a drug problem. Wesson never held a steady job; he lived off welfare and had his working adult children give him all their earnings. In 1989, Wesson was convicted of welfare fraud and perjury. The family often lived in run-down shacks, boats, and vacant houses.

Wesson was abusive towards his wife and children. He prevented Elizabeth from participating in the children's upbringing. He homeschooled the children and taught them from his own handwritten Bible that focused on Jesus Christ being a vampire. He told the children that he was God and had them refer to him as "Master" or "Lord." He taught the children to be prepared for Armageddon and said that the girls were destined to become Wesson's future wives. Wesson's school "curriculum" involved teaching girls oral sex as young as 8 or 9. Their domestic responsibilities included washing Wesson's dreads and scratching his armpits and head. The girls were not allowed to talk to their male siblings or their mother. Both male and female children were physically abused.  Wesson raped two daughters and three nieces, beginning at age eight. Each of the five girls became pregnant.

Murders
Before March 12, 2004, Wesson had declared his intention to relocate his daughters and their children to Washington state, where Wesson's parents lived. On March 12, 2004, several members of Wesson's extended family, along with two nieces who rebelled against him, converged on his family compound demanding the release of their children. Fresno police were summoned to what was described as a child custody issue, and a standoff ensued. Wesson told the police to wait at the door and disappeared into the home. When he came back to the door, his clothes were bloodied.

Fresno police testified they did not hear gunshots being fired shortly after, though other witnesses at the standoff testified they did hear gunshots fired at that time. In the aftermath, police discovered nine bodies, including two of Wesson's daughters and a total of seven of their children, in a bedroom filled with antique coffins. Each victim had been fatally shot through the eye. Wesson's other children, who were not present inside the house, survived the incident.

Victims

 Sebhrenah April Wesson (age 25): Daughter
 Elizabeth Breahi Kina Wesson (age 17): Daughter
 Illabelle Carrie Wesson (age 8): Daughter/Granddaughter
 Aviv Dominique Wesson (age 7): Daughter/Grand-niece
 Johnathon St Charles Wesson (age 7): Son/Grand-nephew
 Ethan St Laurent Wesson (age 4): Son/Grand-nephew
 Marshey St Christopher Wesson (age 1): Son/Grandson
 Jeva St Vladensvspry Wesson (age 1): daughter/granddaughter
 Sedona Vadra Wesson (age 1): Daughter/Grand-niece

Trial
At Wesson's trial, the prosecutor was Chief Deputy District Attorney Lisa Gamoian. Wesson was represented by public defenders Peter Jones and Ralph Torres. They presented the defense that his 25-year-old daughter Sebhrenah committed all the murders, including of her son Marshey, and then committed suicide. The murder weapon, a .22 caliber handgun, was found with her body, and Sebhrenah's DNA was found on the gun, which lent credence to Wesson's claim. The jury declined to find that Wesson fired the fatal shots but convicted him of murder anyway, presumably finding that he had pressured his children into entering a suicide pact.

Conviction and sentence
Wesson was convicted of nine counts of first-degree murder on June 17, 2005, and also found guilty on 14 counts of forcible rape and the sexual molestation of seven of his daughters and nieces. Wesson was sentenced to death on June 27, 2005, and is currently in San Quentin State Prison.

See also
 List of homicides in California
List of child abuse cases featuring long-term detention
Li Hao (murderer)
2019 South Wales paternal sex abuse case

References

External links
 Fresno police chief: 'Horrific' scene at home at CNN.com
 Scheeres, Julia. Marcus Wesson orders the death of 9 of his children all spawned of incest. Crime Library. Retrieved on 2007-11-16.

1946 births
2004 mass shootings in the United States
2004 murders in the United States
African-American United States Army personnel
American mass murderers
American murderers of children
American people convicted of child sexual abuse
American people convicted of murder
American prisoners sentenced to death
American rapists
Criminals from Kansas
Cult leaders
Filicides in California
Former Seventh-day Adventists
Founders of new religious movements
Living people
Mass shootings in the United States
People convicted of incest
People convicted of murder by California
Prisoners sentenced to death by California
Violence against children
Incestual abuse